Fahrudin Zejnilović (unknown – 22 March 2014) was a Bosnian professional football manager and former player.

Playing career
Zejnilović played with Borac Banja Luka in the 1977–78 Yugoslav First League before moving to Slovenia and playing with Maribor and Svoboda Ljubljana (known as Merkator back then) in the Yugoslav Second League in the seasons 1979–80 and 1980–81. He played again in the Second League in the 1984–85 season with Serbian club Trepča.

In between Zejnilović played abroad, first at Turkey giant Fenerbahçe in the first half of the 1981–82 season, and in Austria, with Galus Wolfsberg, in the second half of that same season.

Managerial career
Zejnilović started his managerial career still back in the mid to late 1980s when he managed Istra and Famos Hrasnica. Later, after the Yugoslav Wars, he took charge of TOŠK Tešanj which he promoted to the First League of Bosnia and Herzegovina in 1999. After TOŠK, Zejnilović managed Đerzelez from 2000 until 2001 and later Igman Konjic.

He was then named by the Bosnia and Herzegovina FA to be head coach of the Bosnia and Herzegovina U18 national team at the 2005 Mediterranean Games. Abroad, Zejnović managed Ethiopian Premier League club Saint George in 2007.

In November 2012, he was the caretaker manager of Bosnian Premier League club Olimpik for one match.

Later life
In December 2013, an unknown person throw from a car a bomb which detonated in front of Zejnilović's house in Sarajevo with no consequences besides material damage. Zejnilović died just four months later on 22 March 2014 in Sarajevo.

References

Date of birth unknown
2014 deaths
Footballers from Sarajevo
Association footballers not categorized by position
Yugoslav footballers
FK Borac Banja Luka players
NK Maribor players
NK Svoboda Ljubljana players
Fenerbahçe S.K. footballers
FK Trepča players
Yugoslav First League players
Yugoslav Second League players
Süper Lig players
Yugoslav expatriate footballers
Expatriate footballers in Turkey
Yugoslav expatriate sportspeople in Turkey
Expatriate footballers in Austria
Yugoslav expatriate sportspeople in Austria
Yugoslav football managers
Bosnia and Herzegovina football managers
FK Famos Hrasnica managers
NK TOŠK Tešanj managers
FK Igman Konjic managers
Saint George S.C. managers
FK Olimpik managers
Premier League of Bosnia and Herzegovina managers
Bosnia and Herzegovina expatriate football managers
Expatriate football managers in Ethiopia